Anthony Lamar Banks (born April 5, 1973) is a former American football quarterback who played in the National Football League (NFL) for 12 seasons. Selected by the St. Louis Rams 
in the second round of the 1996 NFL Draft, he also was a member of the Baltimore Ravens, Washington Redskins, and Houston Texans. With the Ravens, Banks was part of the team that won the franchise's first Super Bowl title in Super Bowl XXXV.

High school years
Banks attended Hoover High School in San Diego, California, and was a letterman in football, basketball, and baseball.

Post high school and college years
Banks played right field for the Minnesota Twins' Class A team in Ft. Myers, Florida, before enrolling at San Diego Mesa College in San Diego. He played there two years before transferring to Michigan State University.
Banks places among the all-time record holders at Michigan State. He ranks sixth in passing completion percentage, tenth in career passing yards, and tenth in passing touchdowns. Banks was the first quarterback selected in the 1996 NFL Draft.

In the October 2010 issue of Sports Illustrated, former NFL agent Josh Luchs claimed he paid Banks 'several hundred dollars a month' while Banks was at Michigan State, a violation of NCAA eligibility rules.

College statistics

Professional career

St. Louis Rams
Tony Banks was drafted in the second round of the 1996 NFL Draft by the St. Louis Rams as the first quarterback selected in that year's draft. He soon found himself the starter as a rookie. Banks recorded significant yardage and touchdowns but would also end up setting a record for fumbles that first season, with 21. The team finished with a 6-10 record. Throughout the next two seasons Banks's play would fail to improve significantly as the Rams would finish last in their division with records of 5-11 and 4-12. During his time in St. Louis he developed a reputation for having a cocky attitude and a poor work ethic. After a 14-0 loss to the Miami Dolphins in Week 7 of 1998 he skipped the team flight back to St. Louis and did not appear at practice the next day. After three seasons with the Rams, the team signed Trent Green and then traded Banks to the Ravens for two draft picks.

Baltimore Ravens
Banks accumulated the best statistics of his career with the Baltimore Ravens. The Ravens started Scott Mitchell and Stoney Case early in 1999, but neither worked out, so the team turned to Banks. In 1999, he threw a career-high 17 TDs next to only eight interceptions. He also mustered 2,136 passing yards. Banks played well in early 2000, but his fumbles and INTs cost the team two games in October. Feeling the offense needed a spark after failing to score a touchdown over an entire month, the team replaced him with backup Trent Dilfer, who would remain the starter through the team's Super Bowl XXXV win. He finished 2000 with eight touchdowns and eight interceptions and was released in the off-season.

Dallas Cowboys
Leading into the 2001 season, Banks was signed by the Dallas Cowboys to replace the recently released and later retired Troy Aikman; however, on August 15, 2001, Banks was abruptly released by the Cowboys who chose instead to go with rookie Quincy Carter.

Washington Redskins
Later that year, Banks signed with the Washington Redskins during Marty Schottenheimer's one-year tenure as head coach. While with the Redskins, he became the first quarterback to follow an 0–5 start with five straight wins. He was released after the season.

Houston Texans
Tony Banks signed with the Houston Texans. He was the second-string quarterback for the Houston Texans behind David Carr. He claims that he was asked by Houston's coaches not to play too well in practice to ensure that he would not upstage David Carr, who the team had drafted first overall in the 2002 NFL Draft. During his four-year tenure with the team, Banks received minimal playing time. On February 28, 2006, Banks was released by the Texans. He never returned to the NFL.

NFL career statistics

Regular season

Postseason

Coaching career 
On March 9, 2020, Greenhill School, a private k-12 school in Addison Texas, announced that they were hiring Tony Banks as their Head Football Coach. He had previously served the school as an assistant coach.

References

External links

1973 births
Living people
American football quarterbacks
Baltimore Ravens players
Dallas Cowboys players
Michigan State Spartans football players
St. Louis Rams players
Houston Texans players
San Diego Mesa Olympians football players
Washington Redskins players
Players of American football from San Diego
African-American players of American football
21st-century African-American sportspeople
20th-century African-American sportspeople